Phrataria is a genus of moths in the family Geometridae erected by Francis Walker in 1863. All the species in this genus are known from Australia.

Species
Phrataria bijugata (Walker, [1863])
Phrataria transcissata Walker, [1863]
Phrataria replicataria Walker, 1866
Phrataria v-album Turner, 1944

References

Oenochrominae